Walter William Ahlschlager (July 19, 1887 – March 28, 1965) was a 20th-century American architect. After being located in Chicago for many years, he established his office in Dallas, Texas in 1940. He died in Dallas.

Noted designs
Davis Theater, Chicago, Illinois (1918)
Sovereign Hotel, Edgewater, Chicago (1920)
Sheridan Plaza Hotel, Uptown, Chicago, Illinois (1921)
Peabody Hotel, Memphis, Tennessee (1926)
Uptown Broadway Building, Uptown, Chicago, Illinois (1926) 
The fieldhouses at several Chicago public parks, including Riis Park, Simons Park and Kelvyn Park
Roxy Theatre, New York City (1927)
Irvin Cobb Hotel Paducah, Kentucky (1929)
Medinah Athletic Club (Chicago, Illinois) InterContinental Chicago, Downtown Chicago, (1929)
Beacon Hotel and Theatre, New York City (1929)
Carew Tower, Cincinnati, Ohio (1930)
City Place Tower, Oklahoma City, Oklahoma (1931)
Mercantile National Bank Building, Dallas, Texas (1943)
Wichita Plaza Building, Wichita, Kansas (1962)
The Wedgwood, Castle Hills, Texas (1965)

Personal life

Ahlschlager was born to German Jews John and Louise Ahlschlager and had one sister named Ella. John Ahlschlager and his brother, Frederick, were both "prominent local [Chicago] architects."

References

External links

Article on Work of Walter Ahlschlager
Partial list of Ahlschlager-designed theaters at Cinema Treasures

1965 deaths
1887 births
Architects from Chicago
American people of German-Jewish descent
American theatre architects
Jewish architects